Bulbophyllum auratum is a species of orchid.

External links 

auratum